UNILU may refer to:

 University of Lubumbashi, a university located in Lubumbashi in the Democratic Republic of the Congo
 University of Lucerne, a public university in Lucerne, Switzerland
 University of Luxembourg, a public research university in Luxembourg City, Luxembourg